The Wild Blue Yonder is a 2005 science fiction fantasy film by German director Werner Herzog. It was presented at the 62nd Venice Film Festival, where it won the FIPRESCI Award. It was screened in competition at the Mar del Plata International Film Festival and the Sitges Film Festival, winning the "Carnet Jove – Special Mention" award at the latter. Most of the film consists of recontextualized documentary footage which is overlaid with fictional (sometimes fantastical) narration. This technique was used in Herzog's earlier film Lessons of Darkness (1992).

The film's name comes from the first line of the song "The U.S. Air Force". The scenes in space are courtesy of NASA.

Plot
The film is about an extraterrestrial (played by Brad Dourif) who came to Earth several decades ago from a water planet (The Wild Blue Yonder) after it experienced an ice age. His narration reveals that his race has tried through the years to form a community on our planet, without any success.

The alien also tells the story of a space mission he found out about through his job with the CIA. In the late 1990s, debris from the Roswell UFO crash was unearthed and examined. Scientists incorrectly believed that they had contracted an infectious alien disease from the debris. An exploratory mission was launched to Blue Yonder (represented using archive footage from the STS-34 Space Shuttle mission and Henry Kaiser's diving expedition in Antarctica) to explore the possibility of establishing a new, uninfected human colony on the planet. After finding Blue Yonder suitable for human habitation, the astronauts returned home 820 years later, only to discover that Earth had been abandoned in their absence.

Soundtrack

Trivia

According to the DVD extras, the interview with the alien is filmed in Niland, CA, and nearby Slab City, CA.

References

External links
 
 
 

German avant-garde and experimental films
2005 films
Films shot in Antarctica
English-language German films
German science fiction films
2000s avant-garde and experimental films
2000s English-language films
2000s German films